.pkg (package) is a filename extension used for several file formats that contain packages of software and other files to be installed onto a certain device, operating system, or filesystem, such as the macOS, iOS, PlayStation Vita, PlayStation 3, and PlayStation 4.

 The macOS and iOS operating systems made by Apple use .pkg extensions for Apple software packages using the Xar format internally. 
 PlayStation Vita, Sony PlayStation 3, Sony PlayStation 4 — used for installation of PlayStation Vita, PlayStation 3 and PlayStation 4 software, applications, homebrew, and DLC from the PlayStation Store
 Solaris, or SunOS operating system (OS) and illumos - Denotes software packages that can be installed, removed and tracked using the pkgadd, pkgrm, and pkginfo commands. Solaris is a derivative of the AT&T UNIX OS, and the .pkg extension was also used on AT&T UNIX System V OS.
 AT&T UNIX System V .pkg files are cpio archives that contain specific file tree structures.
 Symbian use .pkg files to store configuration information used to generate .sis installer packages.
 BeOS Used .pkg files in the 90's as part of their software package platform. Be Inc. bought Starcode Software Inc. and acquired their packaging tools.
 Apple Newton operating system used files ending in .pkg for Newton applications and software. As a result, when seen from the Mac OS X Finder, Newton applications appear the same as Mac OS X Installer packages, however they do not share their file format.
 PTC/CoCreate 3D Modeling application use .pkg files to store model files. This .pkg file uses the zip file format.
 Microsoft is said to use .pkg files for profile storage on Xbox Live.
 L3 Avionics systems use some .pkg files for software updates.

See also
List of software package management systems

References 

PKG